William K. Oh, is an American medical oncologist, academic and industry leader and expert in the management of genitourinary malignancies, including prostate, renal, bladder and testicular cancers.

Oh is Chief Medical Officer for the  Prostate Cancer Foundation, the world’s leading philanthropy for prostate cancer.  He previously served as CMO for Sema4, a publicly traded genomics and health intelligence company. For 11 years, Oh was Chief of the Division of Hematology and Medical Oncology at The Mount Sinai Medical Center in New York City, Deputy Director at Mount Sinai's NCI-designated Tisch Cancer Institute, Professor of Medicine and Urology and the Ezra M. Greenspan, M.D., Professor in Clinical Cancer Therapeutics at The Icahn School of Medicine at Mount Sinai.

Oh is the author of more than 350 articles and 125 abstracts. He is the editor of 6 books and the author of 25 book chapters. He has been listed in Castle Connolly's "America's Top Doctors for Cancer" from 2008 to 2022, "Best Doctors in America" from 2003 to 2022, was listed among New York Magazine's "Top Doctors" from 2010–2022.  He continues on the faculty at Mount Sinai as Clinical Professor of Medicine in the Tisch Cancer Institute.

Biography
Oh was born in South Korea and immigrated to the US as a child.  He earned a B.S. from Yale University in 1987 and his M.D. from New York University School of Medicine in 1992. He completed an internship and a residency at Brigham and Women's Hospital in Boston and a clinical fellowship at the Dana–Farber Cancer Institute.

From 1997 to 2009, Oh served on the faculty of Harvard Medical School, where he was Associate Professor of Medicine and Clinical Director of the Lank Center for Genitourinary Oncology. In 2009, he joined The Mount Sinai Medical Center as the Ezra M. Greenspan Professor in Clinical Cancer Therapeutics and Professor of Medicine and Urology, as well as Chief of the Division of Hematology and Medical Oncology in Mount Sinai's Department of Medicine.

Oh is a leading member of the American Society of Clinical Oncology. He has served on multiple editorial boards including the journals The Prostate, Clinical Genitourinary Cancer, the American Journal of Hematology and Oncology and CA – A Cancer Journal for Clinicians.

He co-edited the book Mount Sinai Expert Guides: Oncology which was published in 2019.

Oh has been the principal investigator on multiple clinical trials of chemotherapy in castration-resistant (CRPC) prostate cancer and for three trials of neoadjuvant chemotherapy in high-risk localized prostate cancer patients.

At the Dana–Farber Cancer Institute, from 2000 to 2009, Oh developed and managed a prospective clinical database linked to blood and tissue banks for more than 8,000 prostate cancer patients, with links to blood samples and tissue repositories, for exploration of research and prognostic applications, including: efficacy of various therapies in CRPC, hormonal therapy, testosterone as a marker for cancer outcome, relapse predictions based on nutritional factors at diagnosis and autoantibody signatures, and assessment of pharmacogenomic patterns predicting Gleason score. At Mount Sinai, he continued this work and developed a clinicogenomic database that resulted in multiple publications.

Honors and awards
 1992 Alpha Omega Alpha
 1992 Prize in Internal Medicine, NYU School of Medicine
 1997 ASCO/AACR Methods in Clinical Cancer Research Workshop
 2003 Compassionate Caregiver of the Year, Kenneth B. Schwartz Center, Honorable Mention
 2003–present, Best Doctors in America
 2005 2009 Boston Magazine "Top Doctors"
 2007–2008 Brigham/Harvard Business School Physician Leadership Program
 2008–present, America's Top Doctors for Cancer (Castle Connolly)
 2010 Prostate Cancer Foundation Creativity Award
 2010–present, New York Magazine "Top Doctors"
 2011 Election to the American Society of Clinical Investigation (ASCI)
 2013 Fellow, American College of Physicians (FACP)

Publications
Partial list:

References

External links
 Mount Sinai Hospital homepage
 Icahn School of Medicine at Mount Sinai homepage
 Prostate Cancer Foundation homepage

American oncologists
Cancer researchers
Icahn School of Medicine at Mount Sinai faculty
Living people
New York University Grossman School of Medicine alumni
Yale University alumni
Year of birth missing (living people)